Jeanette Laura Tillett (August 8, 1888 – July 22, 1965) was an American composer and music educator based in Texas.

Tillett was born in Abilene to Henry Augustus and Mary Benjamin Smith Tillett. Her father was an attorney who represented his district in the Texas Senate. Her birth name was "Nettie," which she later changed to "Jeanette."

Tillett studied piano with Harold von Mickwitz and Severin Eisenberger. She founded and managed the Fort Worth Conservatory of Music, and also taught at Texas Christian University. She belonged to Mu Phi Epsilon. In 1932,  she was a founding member of the Fort Worth Music Teachers Association, serving as its president in 1954–55.

Tillett's fellow composer Esther Cox Todd promoted and sold Tillett's music after her death in 1965. Tillett's compositions were published by Belwin Inc. and Willis Music Co. They included:

Chamber 

Blue Bonnets of Texas (piano, violin & voice)

Piano 

Sonata No. 1 in C Major
Teen Topics Sonatina
Three Western Sketches

References 

American composers
American women composers
People from Abilene, Texas
American music educators
1888 births
1965 deaths
Texas Christian University faculty